The Advanced Systems Laboratory (ASL) is an Indian defence laboratory of the Defence Research and Development Organisation (DRDO). Located in Hyderabad, Telangana, it conducts research on Solid Propulsion Technologies, Composites, Aerospace Mechanisms, NDT Techniques, System Design and Analysis, Mission Design and Studies, Guidance Design and Control Systems. The present director of ASL is Dr. MRM Babu.

References

External links
advanced-systems-laboratory

Defence Research and Development Organisation laboratories
Research and development in India
Education in Telangana
Year of establishment missing